Abronia bogerti, known by the common name Bogert's arboreal alligator lizard, is a species of lizard in the family Anguidae. The species is endemic to Mexico.

Etymology
The specific name, bogerti, is in honor of American herpetologist Charles Mitchill Bogert.

Geographic range
A. bogerti is indigenous to eastern Oaxaca, Mexico. A single specimen, the holotype, of A. bogerti was collected in 1954, and it was not seen again until 2000, at which time a second specimen was photographed.  The type locality is "north of Niltepec, between Cerro Atravesado and Sierra Madre, Oaxaca".

Behavior
A. bogerti is largely arboreal.

Reproduction
A. bogerti is viviparous.

Conservation status
Because the species A. bogerti was collected in the canopy of the forest, it is believed that deforestation and ongoing crop and livestock farming pose the largest threats to its survival.  Mexican law protects the lizard.

References

Further reading
Campbell JA, Frost DR (1993). "Anguid lizards of the genus Abronia: revisionary notes, descriptions of four new species, a phylogenetic analysis, and key". Bulletin of the American Museum of Natural History 216: 1–121.
Mata-Silva, Vicente; Johnson, Jerry D.; Wilson, Larry David; Gárcia-Paqdilla, Elí (2015). "The herpetofauna of Oaxaca, Mexico: composition, physiographic distribution, and conservation status". Mesoamerican Herpetology 2 (1): 6-62.
Tihen JA (1954). "Gerrhonotine Lizards Recently Added to the American Museum Collection, with Further Revision of the Genus Abronia ". American Museum Novitates (1687): 1-26. (Abronia bogerti, new species, pp. 3–7, Figure 3).

Abronia
Endemic reptiles of Mexico
Reptiles described in 1954
Species known from a single specimen